Schobert Nunatak is a nunatak overlooking the terminus of Bowman Glacier, standing 4 nautical miles (7 km) east of Mount Dean, at the northeast end of Quarles Range, Queen Maud Mountains. First mapped by the Byrd Antarctic Expedition, 1928–30. Named by Advisory Committee on Antarctic Names (US-ACAN) for William J. Schobert, aviation electrician and maintenance shop supervisor with U.S. Navy Squadron VX-6 for several Deep Freeze operations, 1964-67 period.

Nunataks of the Ross Dependency
Amundsen Coast